Girdəni (also, Girdany) is a village and municipality in the Lankaran Rayon of Azerbaijan.  It has a population of 4,688.

References 

Populated places in Lankaran District